Phil or Phillip Coleman may refer to:

 Phil Coleman (athlete) (born 1931), American runner
 Phil Coleman (footballer) (born 1960), English footballer
 Phillip Coleman (spree killer)